Chike Augustine is a Trinidad and Tobago basketball player.

College career
Chike Augustine received an athletic scholarship for Martin Methodist College (MMC) in 2015 following his participation in the Caribbean Hoops 25/8 Exposure Camp in Trinidad. 

At MMC he played four years total. His last collegiate game was on February 28 against Stillman College in the Southern States Athletic Conference (SSAC) Men’s Basketball Championship.

Altogether, Augustine accumulated 294 rebounds and 85 blocks in a total of 97 games throughout his college career.

In the 2016-2017 season he was ranked number 17 in the National Association of Intercollegiate Athletics (NAIA) Division I SSAC in total blocks (42), and number 18 in blocks per game (1.400).

Professional career
In the 2019-20 season he played a total of 16 games with Aloe Plus Lanzarote Conejeros, in which he scored 124 points with an average of 7.8 per game. He grabbed 101 rebounds, most of them in defensive actions, put up 17 blocks and had 132 efficiency points. 

In October 2020, he renewed his contract with Lanzarote in their fifth season in the EBA League, after what was described as a "great performance in the team's inner game". Chike Augustine would continue his tenure with the alongside teammates Richard Nguema and Elvis Pereira who also received a contract extension.

Personal
Augustine is originally from Port of Spain, Trinidad and Tobago.

He measures six-foot 10-inches.

At Martin Methodist College Augustine pursued a Bachelor of Science in Sport management. He expressed future plans on doing broadcasting journalism.

Player profile
At college, Chike Augustine played the forward position. There, he was known for his defensive presence.

Since the start of his professional career, he has played center.

References

External links
Profile at ESPN
Bio at UTSouthern Firehawks
Profile at Eurobasket.com
Spanish Basketball Federation Profile

1992 births
Living people
Centers (basketball)
UT Southern FireHawks men's basketball players
Sportspeople from Port of Spain
Trinidad and Tobago expatriates in Spain
Trinidad and Tobago men's basketball players